The Jane is a boutique hotel located at 505–507 West Street, with its main entrance at 113 Jane Street in the West Village section of the Greenwich Village neighborhood of Manhattan, New York City.

The building was originally the American Seamen's Friend Society Sailors' Home and Institute, a hotel for sailors built in 1906–08 and designed by William A. Boring in Georgian style. The building featured a chapel, a concert hall, and a bowling alley, and a beacon which played over the river from the polygonal observatory. The hotel was used to house the survivors of the RMS Titanic while the American inquest into the sinking was held.

In 1944, the YMCA took over the building from the Seaman's Retreat Center as it was then called. Later known as The Jane West, and most-recently called the Riverview Hotel. The hotel was renovated by developers Sean MacPherson and Eric Goode in 2008 in partnership with BD Hotels, converting a facility which had become long-term housing for drug addicts and those down on their luck into an upscale hotel.

During a period in the mid-1980’s, the American drag performer RuPaul lived in the tower of the hotel.

The building is a New York City landmark, designated in 2000.

It was reported in late 2022 that it would become a members-only establishment.

Jane Street Theatre
The ballroom of the hotel was converted into a theatre space by Theater for the New City in the 1970s. The Jane Street Theatre was an Off-Broadway theatre which had a very small thrust stage and a seating capacity of 280. Notable shows which were presented there include Hedwig and the Angry Inch and tick, tick ... BOOM!.

The space later became available for commercial rental, but it is now the Jane Ballroom, the bar of The Jane. The Jane Ballroom was shut down for six months from late 2009 to May 2010, when police investigating the complaints of neighbors about noise from the people lined up trying to get inside discovered that the bar did not have an assembly permit.

See also
List of New York City Designated Landmarks in Manhattan below 14th Street

References
Notes

External links
 
 List of New York City Designated Landmarks in Manhattan below 14th Street

 Interior and exterior photos of The Jane

Theatres in Manhattan
Hotels in Manhattan
New York City Designated Landmarks in Manhattan
West Village
Buildings and structures on the National Register of Historic Places in New York City
Buildings and structures completed in 1908
West Side Highway